Novosukkulovo (Yañı Hıwıqqul) is a rural locality (a village) in Nikolayevsky Selsoviet, Tuymazinsky District, Bashkortostan, Russia. The population was 18 as of 2010. There is 1 street.

Geography 
Novosukkulovo is located 23 km southeast of Tuymazy (the district's administrative centre) by road. Kendektamak is the nearest rural locality.

References 

Rural localities in Tuymazinsky District